Co-option (also co-optation, sometimes spelt coöption or coöptation) has two common meanings.

It may refer to the process of adding members to an elite group at the discretion of members of the body, usually to manage opposition and so maintain the stability of the group. Outsiders are "co-opted" by being given a degree of power on the grounds of their elite status, specialist knowledge, or potential ability to threaten essential commitments or goals ("formal co-optation").  Co-optation may take place in many other contexts, such as a technique by a dictatorship to control opposition.

Co-optation also refers to the process by which a group subsumes or acculturates a smaller or weaker group with related interests; or, similarly, the process by which one group gains converts from another group by replicating some aspects of it without adopting the full program or ideal ("informal co-optation"). Co-optation is associated with the cultural tactic of recuperation, and is often understood to be synonymous with it.

First sense

In a 1979 article for Harvard Business Review, consultants John Kotter and Leonard Schlesinger presented co-optation as a "form of manipulation" for dealing with employees who are resistant to new management programs:

Co-opting an individual usually involves giving him or her a desirable role in the design or implementation of the change. Co-opting a group involves giving one of its leaders, or someone it respects, a key role in the design or implementation of a change. This is not a form of participation, however, because the initiators do not want the advice of the co-opted, merely his or her endorsement.

Reasons for use
Two common uses of co-option are firstly, to recruit members who have specific skills or abilities needed by the group which are not available among existing members. Secondly, to fill vacancies which could not be filled by the usual process (normally election), e.g. if suitable candidates appear subsequently.  Co-opted members may or may not have the same rights as the elected members of a group (such as the right to vote on motions), depending on the rules of the group. Sociologist William Gamson defined co-optation as "challengers gaining access to the public policy process but without achieving actual policy changes."

Limitations on use
If a group is elected or appointed based on its members representing specific constituencies, co-option to fill vacancies is inappropriate, as a member selected by existing members will not necessarily represent the interests of the group represented by the vacating member.  In this case, vacancies may be filled via a mechanism specified in its rules, such as a by-election.  Examples are:
 geographical constituencies (as used in legislatures in the United States and United Kingdom)
 constituencies of adherents to a political party, known as proportional representation (as used in legislatures in Israel and New Zealand)
 ethnic groups (as used in Māori constituencies in the New Zealand legislature)
 any other affinity group.

Nomenclature
Sociologist Philip Selznick, in the context of the Tennessee Valley Authority (TVA), described this form as "formal cooptation".

Second sense
This is arguably a derivation from the first sense. The outcome of such co-option will be specific to the individual case, and will depend on the relative strength of the co-opting and co-opted groups, the degree of alignment of their interests, and the vigour with which their members are prepared to pursue those interests. For example, when corporations greenwash their brands by co-opting the tone of environmentalism without any deep reform of their environmental impact, both environmental advocates and the general public must decide how to engage (or not) with the greenwashed result (accept it wholly, boycott it, apply pressure from another angle, ignore it, or some other path).

Selznick, again in the context of the Tennessee Valley Authority, described this form as "informal co-optation", although the process he describes is almost indistinguishable from the corrupt sale of political influence.

See also
Entryism
Recuperation (politics)

References

External links

Elections
Political terminology
Group processes